Municipal elections were held in Toronto, Ontario, Canada, on January 1, 1943. Incumbent Frederick J. Conboy was acclaimed as mayor. There was a very low voter turnout, but the election was a victory for the left as the Co-operative Commonwealth Federation (CCF) and Communist Party each won two seats.

Toronto mayor
For the second time in a row no one chose to run against incumbent Frederick J. Conboy and he was acclaimed as mayor.

Results
Frederick J. Conboy - acclaimed

Board of Control
All incumbents were re-elected Board of Control.

Results
Lewis Duncan (incumbent) - 40,060
Robert Hood Saunders (incumbent) - 33,081
Fred Hamilton (incumbent) - 28,919
William J. Wadsworth (incumbent) - 27,031
C.E. Reynolds - 26,194
Minerva Reid - 18,320
J.C. Irwin - 16,860
G.P. Granell - 5,010
Harry Bradley - 3,590

City council

Ward 1 (Riverdale)
Leslie Saunders (incumbent) - 3,743
Gordon Millen (incumbent) - 3,715
R.E. Wright - 2,333
W.S.B. Armstrong - 1,291

Ward 2 (Cabbagetown and Rosedale)
Louis Shannon (incumbent) - 3,452
William Dennison - 2,907
Henry Glendinning (incumbent) - 2,783

Ward 3 (West Downtown and Summerhill)
John Frank - 1,648
John S. Simmons (incumbent) - 1,396
W.R. Shaw - 1,078
Marjorie Garrow - 635
Harold Fishleigh - 462

Ward 4 (The Annex, Kensington Market and Garment District)
J. B. Salsberg - 4,783
Nathan Phillips (incumbent) - 2,472
David Balfour (incumbent) - 2,432
Herbert Orliffe - 2,093
William Condle - 290

Ward 5 (Trinity-Bellwoods
Stewart Smith - 5,186
Ernest Bogart (incumbent) - 4,653
C.M. Carrie (incumbent) - 3,423
Maxwell Armstrong - 1,422

Ward 6 (Davenport and Parkdale)
William V. Muir (incumbent)  - 4,413
Jack Bennett - 3,750
Kenneth Bert McKellar - 3,007
Robert Stuart - 2,439
F.G. McBrien - 2,098
George Harris - 1,514
H.E. Lister - 746
Nina Dean - 624
H.B. Branscombe - 539
R.M. Wilson - 398

Ward 7 (West Toronto Junction)
Charles Rowntree (incumbent) - 3,749
E.C. Roelofson - 2,242
William C. Davidson (incumbent) - 2,169
Eva Sanderson - 1,757

Ward 8 (The Beaches)
Hiram E. McCallum (incumbent) - 5,195
Walter Howell (incumbent) - 4,725
E.S. McGuinness - 2,606
H.L. McKinstry - 2,335

Ward 9 (North Toronto)
John Innes (incumbent) - 6,479
Donald Fleming (incumbent) - 6,301
Christine McCarty - 3,123

Results taken from the January 2, 1943 Globe and Mail and might not exactly match final tallies.

References
Election Coverage. Globe and Mail. January 2, 1943
Election Coverage. Toronto Star. January 2, 1943

1943 elections in Canada
1943
1943 in Ontario